Block Movement is the fifth album released by B-Legit. It was released on August 23, 2005 for Sick Wid It Records and SMC Recordings and featured production from Rick Rock, One Drop Scott, Jason Moss and G-Man Stan. Block Movement peaked at #91 on the Top R&B/Hip-Hop Albums and #33 on the Independent Albums chart.

Track listing
"Knock His Ass Out"- 3:03  
"Trap Game"- 2:51  
"Sick Wid It"- 3:40  
"Dem Boyz"- 4:05  
"Block 4 Life"- 3:50 (Featuring Jadakiss, Styles P & Clyde Carson)
"Round My Way"- 3:43  
"Guess Who's Back"- 3:57 (Featuring E-40)
"Handle Up"- 3:26  
"Kick It 2 Nite"- 4:02  
"Where Dem Hoes At"- 3:24 (Featuring Paul Wall) 
"Get High"- 4:31 (Featuring Keak da Sneak & Harm) 
"Friendz"- 3:45  
"Kill Somebody"- 3:23  
"Shady"- 3:41  
"Wanna Know Your Name"- 4:23  
"Sewed Up"- 4:13  
 

2005 albums
Albums produced by Rick Rock
B-Legit albums